INS Trikand (F51) is a  of the Indian Navy. She is the third and final ship of the second batch of Talwar-class frigates ordered by the Indian Navy. She was built by the Yantar shipyard in Kaliningrad, Russia. She was commissioned to Indian Navy service on 29 June 2013.

Design

These are modified Krivak III-class frigates built by Russia. These ships use stealth technologies and a special hull design to ensure a reduced radar cross section. Much of the equipment on the ship is Russian-made, but a significant number of systems of Indian origin have also been incorporated. The main difference between the second batch and the first three Talwar-class ships is the use of BrahMos missiles in place of the Klub-N missiles in the earlier ships. She is the last of the three frigates built in Russia as a follow-up order to the first batch of Talwar-class frigates.

Construction
Trikand was laid down on 11 June 2008. She was launched on 27 May 2011 by Ira Malhotra, the wife of the Indian Ambassador to Russia, Ajai Malhotra. Delivery was delayed from the original goal of April 2012 due to labour shortages and supply chain issues.

She was commissioned into the Indian Navy on 29 June 2013 by Vice Admiral R K Dhowan, Vice Chief of Naval Staff, in a ceremony held at Kaliningrad. Captain Ajay Kochhar was the commissioning commanding officer of INS Trikand. She joined join the Western Fleet of the Indian Navy.

Service history

Gallery

References

External links 
Talwar (Krivak III) Class - Bharat Rakshak

Talwar-class frigates
Frigates of the Indian Navy
2011 ships
Ships built at Yantar Shipyard